Sirf Tum is an Indian Hindi romantic drama television series created by Rashmi Sharma. Aired on Colors TV and Voot, the show starred Vivian Dsena and Eisha Singh. It went off air on 16 September 2022.

Plot 
Vikrant Oberoi is a wealthy yet arrogant businessman. He marries Mamta after disowning his first wife Asha and their newborn son Ansh, throwing them out. Asha moves to a new house with Ansh, though she swears to destroy the Oberois, by telling Ansh the truth and raising him to grow to take revenge from the Oberois especially from Mamta and Vikrant's son, Ranveer, who got all the things and name which Ansh lost.

22 years later

Angry and strong minded, Ranveer has grown up to hate Vikrant, after he learnt how he cheated on Mamta by still being in an illegitimate relationship with a woman still after their marriage. On the other hand, Vikrant's manager Rakesh Sharma lives with his loving family including his daughter Suhaani, an aspiring doctor.

Ranveer and Ansh study in the same college. Ranveer has been unaware since his childhood that Ansh is his half-brother and dislikes him, though Ansh knows the truth and still seeks revenge. Suhaani signs up the same college. Rakesh requests Ranveer to take her responsibility, who agrees. In the meantime they become good friends. Riya, a close friend of Ranveer and Suhaani, also studies there who loves Ranveer since childhood, but gets disheartened upon knowing he is falling in love with Suhaani.

Ansh intends to separate Ranveer and Suhaani with Riya's help, but in vain. Suhaani also reciprocates her feelings for Ranveer. Initially hesitant to accept their alliance due to being not well rich than Vikrant, Rakesh finally gives his nod when he understands Ranveer is perfect for Suhaani. The two get engaged much to Vikrant, Riya and Ansh's dismay. Ansh who can't tolerate Ranveer's happiness, finally reveals to him that he is his half-brother, and also hits him hard on his head. Ranveer is left drunk and unconscious, whose proof Ansh shows to Rakesh, saying Ranveer won't come. Rakesh then announces Ansh and Suhaani's marriage. She marries him in a dilemma as Ranveer gets late to reach the venue.                                   

After Ranveer learns about the marriage, he angrily beats Ansh and burns the wedding venue. Ansh finally reveals to Suhani that he married her to snatch every happiness from Ranveer. Eventually, she breaks her marriage with Ansh. Ranveer and Suhani finally get married. Vikrant leaves Mamta and reconciling with Asha, accepting Ansh as his heir. Ansh also marries Honey, a girl who has returned from mental asylum. Later, Honey points a gun at Ranveer, but Ansh gets shot and dies. Asha apologises to Mamta, realising her mistakes, and leaves Vikrant's house. Ranveer insults Suhani, she leaves him and moves to other city with her family members. Honey abducts her and tries to kill her stating she's doing that on Ranvir's orders, which causes Suhani to hate Ranveer. She made a similar misunderstanding with Ranveer, so that he also despises Suhani. At the end, Dr. Aditya (a college student) saves Suhani and offers her and her family a place to stay. Vikrant realises his misdeeds and seeks forgiveness from Mamta.

1 year passes by

Suhani and her family lives with Dr. Aditya, time comes when Suhani returns her house and goes to college and meets Ranveer. Aditya starts falling for Suhani. Ranveer and Suhaani get kidnapped, Aditya finds them and rescues them. He (Dr. Aditya) blames Ranveer saying because of him, Suhaani got kidnapped. Aditya takes Suhaani in his lap and Ranveer hits him and says that Suhaani is his wife, arguments start between them. However Ranveer breaks his relationship with Suhaani.

1 year passes
Ranveer treats a criminal patient . He hates suhani. However police came to hospital to arrest him . Ranveer stops police.However, suhani bails him. Ranveer again falls in love with suhani. He refuses to come home.Later ranveer asks suhani to divorce him. Suhani did not divorce him and story ended by ranveer and suhani reuniting.

Cast

Main
Vivian Dsena as Ranveer Oberoi (2021–2022)
Eisha Singh as Suhani Sharma/Suhani Ranveer Oberoi (2021–2022)

Recurring
Shalini Kapoor Sagar as Mamta Oberoi: Vikrant's second wife; Ranveer's mother (2021–2022)
Nimai Bali as Vikrant Oberoi: Devendra's elder son; Vikram's brother; Asha and Mamta's husband; Ansh and Ranveer's father (2021–2022)
Sanjay Batra as Rakesh Sharma: Aarti's son; Kamini's brother; Vikrant's former employee; Sudha's husband; Suhaani and Ishaan's father (2021–2022)
Eva Ahuja as Sudha Sharma: Rakesh's first wife; Suhaani and Ishaan's mother (2021–2022)
Anil Dhawan as Devendra Oberoi: Vikrant and Vikram's father; Ansh, Ranveer and Samaira's grandfather (2021–2022)
Puneett Chouksey as Ansh Oberoi: Asha and Vikrant's son; Ranveer's half-brother; Samaira's cousin; Suhaani's former husband; Honey's husband (2021–2022) (Dead)
Kajal Pisal as Asha Oberoi: Vikrant's first wife; Ansh's mother (2021–2022) 
Sonyaa Ayodhya as Riya Kapoor (2021–2022)
Jasjeet Babbar as Aarti Sharma: Rakesh and Kamini's mother; Suhaani, Nikita and Ishaan's grandmother (2021–2022)
Amit Dhawan/Mani Rai as Vikram Oberoi: Devendra's son; Vikrant's brother; Roshni's husband; Samaira's father (2021–2022)
Bindiya Kalra as Roshni Oberoi: Vikram's wife; Samaira's mother (2021–2022)
Tanu Vidyarthi as Kamini Sharma: Aarti's daughter; Rakesh's sister; Nikita's mother (2021–2022)
Aakash Rohira as Raghav "Raghu" Tripathi: Ranveer and John's friend (2021–2022)
Sapan Gulati as John Wults: Ranveer and Raghu's friend (2021–2022)
Agam Dixit as Ishaan Sharma: Rakesh and Sudha's son; Suhaani's brother; Nikita's cousin (2021–2022)
Vaidehi Nair as Samaira Oberoi: Vikram and Roshni's daughter; Ansh and Ranveer's cousin (2021–2022)
Shalu Chauhan/Dolly Kaushik as Nikita Chopra: Kamini's daughter; Suhaani and Ishaan's cousin (2021–2022)
Rishika Bali as Meeta Basu (2021–2022)
Amit Rai as Rishi Singhania (2021–2022)
Akshay Patil as Rocky Kundra (2021–2022)
Kamal Malik as Shashi Kapoor: Vikrant and Vikram's friend; Riya's father (2021–2022)
Nikki Sharma as Honey Oberoi: Ansh's wife (2022)
Raghav Tiwari as Dr. Aditya Birla (2022)
Sharik Khan as Karan Arora (2021–2022)

Special appearances 
Bharti Singh for hosting New Year Celebration (2021)
Haarsh Limbachiyaa for hosting New Year Celebration (2021)
Tanya Sharma as Reema Vivaan Oswal from Sasural Simar Ka 2 (2021)
Karan Sharma as Vivaan Oswal from Sasural Simar Ka 2 (2021)
Radhika Muthukumar as Simar Aarav Oswal from Sasural Simar Ka 2 (2021)
Avinash Mukherjee as Aarav Oswal from Sasural Simar Ka 2 (2021)
Sumit Bhardwaj as Samar Khanna from Sasural Simar Ka 2 (2021)
Akash Jagga as Gagan Narayan from Sasural Simar Ka 2 (2021)
Shubhanshi Singh as Aditi Oswal from Sasural Simar Ka 2 (2021)
Nikki Tamboli for New Year Celebration (2021)
Priyal Mahajan as Purvi Virendra Pratap Singh from Molkki (2021)
Amar Upadhyay as Virendra Pratap Singh from Molkki (2021)
Shivangi Joshi as Anandi Bhujaariya Anjaariya from Balika Vadhu 2 (2021)
Samridh Bawa as Jigar Anjaariya from Balika Vadhu 2 (2021)
Jigyasa Singh as Vaani "Thapki" Tripathi Singhania from Thapki Pyar Ki 2 (2021)
Aakash Ahuja as Purab Singhania from Thapki Pyar Ki 2 (2021)
Rachana Mistry as Hansika Agrawal from Thapki Pyar Ki 2 (2021)
Karan Suchak as Dr. Anurag Basu from Thoda Sa Baadal Thoda Sa Paani (2021)
Ishita Dutta as Kajol Mukherjee from Thoda Sa Baadal Thoda Sa Paani (2021)
Surabhi Das as Nima Denzongpa from Nima Denzongpa (2021)
Akshay Kelkar as Suresh Mane from Nima Denzongpa (2021)
Usha Naik as Sunita Mane from Nima Denzongpa (2021)
Sushmita Singh as Siya Mane from Nima Denzongpa (2021)
Sonakshi Batra as Manya Mane from Nima Denzongpa (2021)
Sukanya Baruah as Naari Mane from Nima Denzongpa (2021)
Sharmila Shinde as Tulika Mane from Nima Denzongpa (2021)
 Jayati Bhatia as Geetanjali Devi from Sasural Simar Ka 2 (2022)
 Shakti Singh as Professor Avinash Narayan from Sasural Simar Ka 2 (2022) 
 Anita Kulkarni as Indu Narayan from Sasural Simar Ka 2 (2022)
 Aarav Chowdhary as Gajendra Oswal from Sasural Simar Ka 2 (2022)
 Shital Thakkar as Sandhya Oswal from Sasural Simar Ka 2 (2022)
 Shubhanshi Singh Raghuvanshi as Aditi Gagan Narayan from Sasural Simar Ka 2 (2022)

Soundtrack

Sirf Tum's soundtrack is written by Amit D and composed by Rahul Jain.

References

External links 
 Sirf Tum at Colors TV
 
 Sirf Tum on Voot

Indian television soap operas
Colors TV original programming
Hindi-language television shows
2022 Indian television series debuts